Leoville Airport  is located  west of Leoville, Saskatchewan, Canada.

See also 
List of airports in Saskatchewan

References 

Registered aerodromes in Saskatchewan
Spiritwood No. 496, Saskatchewan